The Pigram Brothers are a seven-piece Indigenous Australian band from the pearling town of Broome, Western Australia, formed in 1996.

They were heavily involved in Broome's musical and theatrical exports – forming the original backing band for Jimmy Chi's 1990 musical Bran Nue Dae, which received international acclaim.

The Pigram Brothers had a large music influence from an early age, and grew up in the rich musical culture of Broome. Alan, Steven and Phillip were members of Scrap Metal from 1983 until its separation in 1995.

In 2000 they were the subject of the one-hour documentary, Saltwater Country, part of ABC Television's Message Stick.

In 2006 Steven and Alan were inducted into the Western Australian Music Hall of Fame.

In 2011, Alan and Steven Pigram began touring with Alex Lloyd as part of the Mad Bastards Trio, performing music from the 2011 film, Mad Bastards. Their soundtrack was nominated for an ARIA Award for Best Original Soundtrack, Cast or Show Album at the 2011 ARIA Awards.

Members
 Alan Pigram – guitar, mandolin, ukulele, tiple
 Stephen Pigram – vocals, acoustic guitar, harmonica, requinto, valiha, ukulele, dulcimer
 David Pigram – vocals, acoustic guitar
 Colin Pigram – vocals, acoustic guitar
 Philip Pigram – vocals, drums
 Peter Pigram – bass guitar
 Gavin Pigram – percussion

Discography

Studio albums

Soundtrack albums

Live albums

Awards and nominations

ARIA Music Awards 
The ARIA Music Awards is an annual awards ceremony that recognises excellence, innovation, and achievement across all genres of Australian music.The Pigram Brothers have received two nominations.

|-
| 2005
| Under The Mango Tree
| ARIA Award for Best World Music Album
| 
|-
| 2011
| Mad Bastards - Music from the Motion Picture
| ARIA Award for Best Original Soundtrack, Cast or Show Album
| 
|-

Deadly Awards
The Deadly Awards were an annual celebration of Australian Aboriginal and Torres Strait Islander achievement in music, sport, entertainment and community. They ran from 1995 to 2013.

 (wins only)
|-
| rowspan="2"| 1998
| Saltwater Country
| Album Release of the Year
| 
|-
| Corrugation Road <small> (with Jimmy Chi and Kuckles)
| Excellence in Film or Theatrical Score 
| 
|-
| rowspan="2"| 2006
| Under the Mango Tree
| Album Release of the Year
| 
|-

West Australian Music Industry Awards
The West Australian Music Industry Awards are annual awards celebrating achievements for Western Australian music. They commenced in 1985.
 
 (wins only)
|-
| 2005
| The Pigram Brothers
| Best Indigenous Act
| 
|-
| 2006
| The Pigram Brothers
| Hall of Fame
| 
|-
| 2007
| The Pigram Brothers
| Best Indigenous Act
| 
|-
| 2008
| The Pigram Brothers
| Best Indigenous Act
| 
|-

References

External links
 (archived - url now usurped)
The Pigram Brothers, Australian Music Online, 2004
 "The Pigram Brothers: a top Aboriginal band talk about their Filipino heritage", by Deborah Ruiz Wall at the Dreaming Festival, Woodford, Queensland 

Musical groups established in 1996
Indigenous Australian musical groups
Western Australian musical groups
Indigenous Australians from Western Australia
People from Broome, Western Australia